The 2017 NHL Stadium Series (officially the 2017 Coors Light NHL Stadium Series for sponsorship reasons) was a regular season National Hockey League (NHL) game played outdoors, part of the Stadium Series of games held at football or baseball stadiums. The Philadelphia Flyers played against the Pittsburgh Penguins at Heinz Field in Pittsburgh, Pennsylvania, on February 25, 2017.

This was the only game in the Stadium Series scheduled during the 2016–17 NHL season (as opposed to multiple games in 2016), but the fourth and last outdoor regular-season games during that season. An announced attendance of 67,318 made the game one of the most attended outdoor NHL games in history.

Background
The game was played to help mark the 50th anniversary of the Expansion of 1967, in which the Flyers and the Penguins, along with four other teams, were formed to double the league's size. This Flyers–Penguins rivalry matchup was originally considered for the 2017 NHL Winter Classic in January, but scheduling conflicts with the National Football League in both cities, along with the belief that Beaver Stadium (a neutral site venue mentioned as a potential site for a Flyers–Penguins outdoor contest) was not properly equipped to host an event during the winter, led to plans for a matchup being moved to a later date as a Stadium Series game in February.

Heinz Field previously hosted the 2011 NHL Winter Classic. This was also the Penguins' fourth outdoor game (after the 2008 and 2011 Winter Classics, and the 2014 Stadium Series), and the Flyers' third (after the 2010 and 2012 Winter Classics).

Game summary

Pittsburgh's Jake Guentzel recorded two assists and Matt Murray made 39 saves en route to a 4-2 victory over Philadelphia. The Penguins got goals from Sidney Crosby, Nick Bonino, Matt Cullen and Chad Ruhwedel. Jakub Voracek and Shayne Gostisbehere scored for the Flyers.

Number in parenthesis represents the player's total in goals or assists to that point of the season

Team rosters

 Marc-André Fleury and Steve Mason dressed as the back-up goaltenders. Neither entered the game.

Scratches
Philadelphia Flyers: Michael Del Zotto, Roman Lyubimov, Nick Schultz
Pittsburgh Penguins: Kris Letang, Steve Oleksy, Carter Rowney

Officials 
 Referees — Eric Furlatt, Ian Walsh
 Linesmen — Brad Kovachik, Derek Amell

Pregame/Anthem/Entertainment

Before the game the Steelers' drumline Pittsburgh Steeline performed

During the team intros the Steelers' wide receiver Antonio Brown introduced the Penguins 

The anthem was performed by a member of the Los Angeles Kings' ice crew Courtney Daniels (who filled in for Fifth Harmony at the 2017 NHL All-Star Game at Staples Center after one of the members had fallen ill)

Train (band) performed during the first intermission (OneRepublic originally was supposed to perform but one of the members had fallen ill)

References

2017
Stadium Series
2017 in ice hockey
2017 in sports in Pennsylvania
Philadelphia Flyers games
Pittsburgh Penguins games
February 2017 sports events in the United States
Ice hockey competitions in Pittsburgh
2010s in Pittsburgh